Christy Opara-Thompson (born 24 December 1971) is a Nigerian athlete who competed mainly in the 100 metres. She competed for Nigeria in the 1992 Summer Olympics held in Barcelona, Spain, where she won the bronze medal in the 4 x 100 metres with her teammates Beatrice Utondu, Faith Idehen and Mary Onyali.

International competitions

External links

 databaseOlympics

1971 births
Living people
Igbo sportspeople
Nigerian female sprinters
Nigerian female long jumpers
Olympic athletes of Nigeria
Olympic bronze medalists for Nigeria
Athletes (track and field) at the 1992 Summer Olympics
Athletes (track and field) at the 1996 Summer Olympics
Commonwealth Games gold medallists for Nigeria
Commonwealth Games silver medallists for Nigeria
Commonwealth Games bronze medallists for Nigeria
Commonwealth Games medallists in athletics
Athletes (track and field) at the 1994 Commonwealth Games
World Athletics Championships athletes for Nigeria
Olympic bronze medalists in athletics (track and field)
African Games silver medalists for Nigeria
African Games medalists in athletics (track and field)
Universiade medalists in athletics (track and field)
African Games bronze medalists for Nigeria
Athletes (track and field) at the 1991 All-Africa Games
Universiade silver medalists for Nigeria
USA Indoor Track and Field Championships winners
Medalists at the 1992 Summer Olympics
20th-century Nigerian women
Medallists at the 1994 Commonwealth Games